Hartshorne Woods Park (pronounced: hurt-shern) is a  county park located in Northern Monmouth County, New Jersey, United States, in New Jersey's Bayshore Region. The park has  of trails, several old military bunkers and a small beach with a fishing pier. It is roughly bordered to the north and west by Navesink Ave and Route 36. Its southern borders are Hartshorne Road and the Navesink River. Its eastern border is the Upper Shrewsbury River. The Park is split into three sections from west to east: The Buttermilk Valley Section, the Monmouth Hills Section, and the Rocky Point Section.

History 

The park is named after Richard Hartshorne, who acquired the land from the Lenape for thirteen shillings after sailing to the Highland in 1670.  Rocky Point, the  easternmost section of the park, contains a World War Two-era Coast Artillery site known as Battery Lewis on the former Highlands Military Reservation (also called Navesink Military Reservation). Later, the Highlands Air Force Station, a long-range air defense radar installation and the Highlands Army Air Defense Site (HAADS) were constructed here. The Air Force closed its installation in 1966. The Army continued to operate HAADS through 1974 to support Nike missile batteries throughout the region, including some which were later revealed by historians at nearby Sandy Hook recreation area to carry nuclear warheads.

In January 2017 a retired US Navy 16"/50 caliber Mark 7 gun, formerly a spare for the s, was placed on display in one of the gun positions of Battery Lewis.

Major trails 

Classification:
Green Circles indicate: Easy Trails for walking.
Blue Squares indicate: Moderate Trails for hikers, equestrians and all-terrain bicycles.
Black Diamonds indicate: Challenging Trails for experienced hikers, equestrians and all-terrain bicyclists.

Buttermilk Valley 

Kings Hollow Trail- easy loop (0.7 mile) 
Candlestick Trail- easy (1.5 miles) - Navesink Overlook
Laurel Ridge Trail- moderate loop (2.5 miles)

Monmouth Hills 

Cuesta Ridge Trail- moderate (1.6 miles)
Grand Tour Trail- challenging (3.1 miles)

Rocky Point 

Lewis Overlook- easy loop (0.2 mile) - There is a trail to the top of Battery Lewis with great views.
Battery Loop- moderate loop (1.3 miles) - Paved surface
Black Fish Cove- moderate (0.3 mile) - Steep trail to pier
Command Loop- moderate (0.4 mile) - Paved surface
Bunker Loop- moderate (0.3 mile)
Rocky Point Trail- challenging (4.1 miles)

Notes

References
Monmouth County Parks System, "Hartshorne Woods Park" n.p., 2005.
"Mountain Bike Trails in New Jersey: Shore Region: Hartshorne Woods Park". May 25, 2006.

External links 
Woods Park Website
Mountain Biking in Hartshorne Woods
Highlands Army Air Defense Site

Parks in Monmouth County, New Jersey
County parks in New Jersey